Voicing of a pipe organ is the art of achieving the required tonal quality from each pipe, as distinct from tuning (setting its pitch or frequency). The term only applies to flue pipes, not to reeds, and is practised by a specialist voicer, who may also be the tuner.

References 

Acoustics
Pipe organ